Ryu Joong-il (born April 28, 1963) is a former South Korean baseball player who is currently a former manager of the LG Twins of the KBO League. 

Ryu had a 30-year association with the Samsung Lions, from 1987 to 2016, starting as a player, then as a junior coach, a regular coach, and finally as the team's manager. As the Lions' manager from 2011 to 2016, he led the team to the Korean Series five straight times (2011–2015), winning the championship four times (2011, 2012, 2013, 2014) and finishing second once (2015).

References

External links

Career statistics and player information from Korea Baseball Organization

1963 births
Living people
Samsung Lions managers
Samsung Lions coaches
Samsung Lions players
KBO League shortstops
Baseball players at the 1984 Summer Olympics
Olympic baseball players of South Korea
Hanyang University alumni
Kyeongbuk High School alumni
Sportspeople from North Gyeongsang Province
South Korean baseball managers
South Korean baseball coaches
South Korean baseball players
World Baseball Classic managers
South Korea national baseball team managers
LG Twins managers